Line of Duty is a 2019 American action thriller film directed by Steven C. Miller and written by Jeremy Drysdale. It stars Aaron Eckhart, Courtney Eaton, Dina Meyer, Ben McKenzie and Giancarlo Esposito.

Plot

Frank Penny is a disgraced cop looking for redemption. When the police chief's 11-year-old daughter is abducted, Frank goes rogue to try and save her. But to find the girl, Frank will need the help of Ava Brooks, whose live-streaming news channel is broadcasting Frank's every move. While a city watches, Frank and Ava race against time and not only do they have to face every daring obstacle but also the abductor's brother who's out for revenge.

Cast

Production
Principal photography and filming took place in Birmingham, Alabama.

Reception
On Metacritic, the film has a weighted average score of 50 out of 100, based on reviews from 5 critics, indicating "mixed or average reviews".

Dennis Harvey of Variety called it "High on energy if low on credibility."
Frank Scheck of The Hollywood Reporter wrote: "Fortunately, the new actioner directed by the prolific Steven C. Miller […] proves fast-paced enough to overcome its more ludicrous plot elements."

References

External links
 

American action thriller films
2019 action thriller films
Films shot in Alabama
Saban Films films
Films directed by Steven C. Miller
Films scored by the Newton Brothers
2010s English-language films
2010s American films